Alpiner is an action video game designed by Janet Srimushnam for the TI-99/4A home computer and published on cartridge by Texas Instruments in 1982. The player climbs six of the world's highest mountains while avoiding trees, animals, falling rocks, and landslides. The mountains in the game are Mount Hood, the Matterhorn, Mount Kenya, Mount McKinley, Mount Garmo, and Mount Everest. The Alpiner cartridge originally retailed for $39.95 (USD).

Gameplay
After selecting 1-2 players and moving past the main screen with the mountains and elevations the game begins. The player must climb the side of each mountain and make it to the summit in the allotted time.

Obstacles placed in the alpiner's way include falling rocks, wild animals, trees, and brush fires that they must avoid to continue up the mountain. In level 7 the avalanche obstacle is introduced, and in level 13, ice falls. Being hit by obstacles will result in sliding a variable distance down the mountain. If the alpiner slides all the way down the mountain, one of the lives are lost. Players receive an additional life every time they make it to the top of Mount Everest.

There are 18 levels in the game divided into 3 rounds. The player must climb each of the six mountains successfully to continue on to the next round.

Sound
The game can be played with or without the commentary or voices, but to play with them requires the use of the TI Solid State Speech Synthesizer. The voices and commentary help to warn of approaching obstacles and comment on your progress.

The music heard during gameplay is Anitra's Dance from Act IV of Peer Gynt by Norwegian composer Edvard Grieg. The music heard after reaching the top of Mount Everest is a fragment of the Suite No. 2, in D Major II - Alla Hornpipe; from Water Music, by German composer Georg Friedrich Händel.

Cheat
Pressing the keys "*#*" (in that exact sequence) on the game's title screen allows players to set their starting number of lives in the game, from 1 to 9 lives, and the level of difficulty, from 1 to 18. However, enabling this cheat displays the word "Test" on the bottom left of the screen, so players cannot fool their friends with the cheat enabled.

References

External links
 Alpiner at TI-99/4A-Pedia
 Alpiner at TI-99/4A Video Game House
 Alpiner at Giant Bomb
 Alpiner at Everything2

1982 video games
Multiplayer and single-player video games
Texas Instruments games
TI-99/4A games
Video games developed in the United States